Ronald William Dix (12 September 1912 – 2 April 1998) was a professional footballer, who holds the record for being the youngest goalscorer in Football League history, when he scored for Bristol Rovers aged 15 years 180 days in 1928.

He won one full international cap for England, scoring against Norway.

During World War II, Dix guested for clubs including Bristol City, Chester, Blackpool, Bradford Park Avenue, Wrexham, York City and Liverpool. He retired from playing in 1949 and died in April 1998 at the age of 85.

References

Sources

1912 births
1998 deaths
English footballers
Footballers from Bristol
England international footballers
Association football forwards
Bristol Rovers F.C. players
Blackburn Rovers F.C. players
Aston Villa F.C. players
Derby County F.C. players
Tottenham Hotspur F.C. players
Reading F.C. players
English Football League players
Blackpool F.C. wartime guest players
Bristol City F.C. wartime guest players
Chester City F.C. wartime guest players
Bradford (Park Avenue) A.F.C. wartime guest players
Wrexham F.C. wartime guest players
York City F.C. wartime guest players
Bradford (Park Avenue) A.F.C. players
English Football League representative players